Brahim Arafat Mezouar (born 18 December 1973 in Hammam Bou Hadjar, Aïn Témouchent Province), is an Algerian former footballer. He last played as a midfielder for MC Oran in the Algerian League.

Club career
 1993-1995 IR Hammam Bouhadjar
 1995-1997 CR Témouchent
 1997-1999 ASM Oran
 1999-2003 CR Belouizdad
 2003-2005 Dubai SC
 2005-2005 JS Kabylie
 2005-2006 CR Belouizdad
 2006-2007 MC Oran
 2007-2007 Dubai SC
 2007-2008 CR Belouizdad
 2008-2010 MC Oran

International career
Mezouar won his first cap for the Algerian national team on 22 January 1999 in an African Cup of Nations qualifier against Tunisia. A year later, he was part of the 2000 African Cup of Nations squad that made it to the quarter-finals. In total, he has 13 caps for Algeria.

Honours
 Won the Algerian league twice with CR Belouizdad in 1999 and 2000

External links
 DZFoot Profile

1973 births
Living people
People from Hammam Bou Hadjar
Algerian footballers
Algeria international footballers
Algerian expatriate footballers
CR Témouchent players
ASM Oran players
JS Kabylie players
MC Oran players
CR Belouizdad players
Dubai CSC players
Algerian expatriate sportspeople in the United Arab Emirates
Expatriate footballers in the United Arab Emirates
2000 African Cup of Nations players
UAE First Division League players
UAE Pro League players
Association football midfielders
21st-century Algerian people